Gourdon Glacier is a glacier  long on the east side of James Ross Island, flowing southeast into Markham Bay between Saint Rita Point and Rabot Point. It has a conspicuous rock wall at its head. The glacier was first surveyed by the Swedish Antarctic Expedition under Otto Nordenskiöld, 1901–04, who named it for Ernest Gourdon, geologist and glaciologist of the French Antarctic Expedition, 1903–05.

See also
 List of glaciers in the Antarctic
 Glaciology

References

Glaciers of James Ross Island